Archbishop Hannan may refer to: 

 Philip Hannan (1913–2011), former Archbishop of New Orleans (1965–1988) 
 Archbishop Hannan High School in St. Tammany Parish, Louisiana